A United Nations Association (UNA) is a non-governmental organization that exist in various countries to enhance the relationship between the people of member states and the United Nations to raise public awareness of the UN and its work, to promote the general goals of the UN.

Their long-term concerns comprise:
 The implementation of the Sustainable Development Goals
 Peace, security and disarmament 
 Human rights and humanitarian affairs

There are currently over 100 UNAs around the world.  The secretariats for the World Federation of United Nations Associations are located in Geneva, Seoul, and New York.

Film festival
The UNA holds a yearly international documentary film festival in Palo Alto called  the "United Nations Association Film Festival" (UNAFF). The festival was founded in 1998 to commemorate the 50th anniversary of the Universal Declaration of Human Rights and is one of the oldest film festivals specifically for documentary films only in the United States.

See also 
 List of United Nations Associations
 League of Nations Union
 World citizen
 World Federation of United Nations Associations (WFUNA)

References

External links
World Federation of United Nations Associations

World Federation of United Nations Associations